Darwinoplectanum is a genus of monopisthocotylean monogeneans, belonging to the family Diplectanidae. 
According to the authors of the genus, it was named after Sir Charles Robert Darwin, "in celebration of his 200th anniversary in 2009".

Species

According to the World Register of Marine Species, the valid species included in the genus are:

 Darwinoplectanum amphiatlanticum Domingues, Diamanka & Pariselle, 2011
 Darwinoplectanum figueiredoi Domingues, Diamanka & Pariselle, 2011
 Darwinoplectanum pilittae Domingues, Diamanka & Pariselle, 2011

References

Diplectanidae
Monogenea genera